Wilson Donald Pelham (April 14, 1908 – March 28, 1981) was an American Negro league outfielder in the 1930s.

A native of Hawthorne, Florida, Pelham made his Negro leagues debut in 1937 with the Jacksonville Red Caps and the Atlanta Black Crackers. He played again for Atlanta the following season, when he served as acting manager and led the team in home runs. Pelham died in Lake County, Florida in 1981 at age 72.

References

External links
 and Baseball-Reference Black Baseball stats and Seamheads

1908 births
1981 deaths
Atlanta Black Crackers players
Jacksonville Red Caps players
20th-century African-American sportspeople
Baseball outfielders